Martha Farmer Brewer (October 26, 1928 – November 14, 2006) was the wife of Alabama's 49th governor Albert Brewer and the former First Lady of Alabama.

She was born in Anniston, Alabama and raised in Chattanooga, Tennessee. While attending college at the University of Alabama she met Albert Brewer. The two were married for 56 years. Brewer and her husband were devoted to each other, and they had a close and physically affectionate marriage.

Albert Brewer served as governor until January 1971. He lost a battle for the 1970 Democratic gubernatorial nomination to George Wallace.

Martha Brewer died on November 14, 2006, in Vestavia Hills, Alabama.  She was survived by her husband, their two daughters, three grandchildren and a great-granddaughter.  Her memorial service was held at the Mountain Brook Baptist Church.

References

1928 births
2006 deaths
First Ladies and Gentlemen of Alabama
Alabama Democrats
People from Anniston, Alabama
University of Alabama alumni
20th-century American politicians
20th-century American women politicians
21st-century American women